Tariq bin Saeed bin Hilail Al-Shammari (born 17 December 1977) is a Saudi Arabian political advisor. has been a Member of the Consultative Assembly of Saudi Arabia since October 2020.

He holds a bachelor's degree from Imam Mohammad Ibn Saud Islamic University and a master's degree in law from Naif Arab University for Security Sciences. He completed a PhD in Law from the University of East Anglia in 2016.

References

1977 births
Living people
Imam Muhammad ibn Saud Islamic University alumni
Alumni of the University of East Anglia
Members of the Consultative Assembly of Saudi Arabia
People from Ha'il